Sándor "Alex" Tarnóczi is a retired Hungarian football (soccer) player who spent eleven seasons in the Major Indoor Soccer League and American Indoor Soccer Association.

Tarnoczi, a native of communist Hungary, fled his country along with Julie Hegyi for the United States in November 1980.  At the time, both were playing for Csepel SC on a tour of Yugoslavia.  The two men walked away from their team and took a flight to Rome where they contacted agents of the Hartford Hellions of the Major Indoor Soccer League.  The Hellions then signed them both and cleared their way for immigration into the United States.  Tarnoczi spent one season with Hartford.  He moved to the New York Arrows for the 1981–1982 season. On 24 December 1981, the Buffalo Stallions purchased Tarnoczi's contract from the Arrows.  He began the 1982–1983 season in Buffalo before moving to the Cleveland Force during the season.  On 12 December 1986, the Force traded Tarnoczi to the New York Express for a first-round draft pick in the 1987 draft.  The Express withdrew from the league and folded at the All Star break.  On 13 March 1987, the Dallas Sidekicks signed Tarnoczi on a ten-day contract.  Six days later, they placed him on a contract until the end of the season.  Tarnoczi then joined the Canton Invaders of the American Indoor Soccer Association.  He was captain of the Invaders during their 1988-1989 championship season.  In the fall of 1989, Tarnoczi joined the Dayton Dynamo.  In January 1990, he moved to the Chicago Power.  He began the 1990–1991 season with Chicago.  He played the 1992–1993 season with the Invaders.

References

External links
 MISL stats
 Dallas Sidekicks: Alex Tarnoczi
 Csepel: Sandor Tarnoczi

Living people
1959 births
Footballers from Budapest
American Indoor Soccer Association players
Buffalo Stallions players
Canton Invaders players
Chicago Power players
Cleveland Force (original MISL) players
Csepel SC footballers
Dallas Sidekicks (original MISL) players
Dayton Dynamo players
Hartford Hellions players
Hungarian defectors
Hungarian footballers
Hungarian expatriate footballers
Major Indoor Soccer League (1978–1992) players
Memphis Americans players
National Professional Soccer League (1984–2001) players
New York Arrows players
New York Express players
Association football forwards
Association football midfielders